Cordrea Tankersley (born November 19, 1993) is an American football cornerback who is a free agent.  He has played for the Miami Dolphins and the Minnesota Vikings of the National Football League (NFL). He played college football at Clemson and was drafted by the Miami Dolphins in the third round of the 2017 NFL Draft.

Early years
Tankersley attended Silver Bluff High School in Aiken, South Carolina. He played quarterback, wide receiver and defensive back in high school. Tankersley also attended Hargrave Military Academy in 2012. He committed to Clemson University to play college football.

College career
As a true freshman at Clemson in 2013, Tankersley recorded 13 tackles over 12 games. As a sophomore in 2014 he played in 13 games and had 12 tackles. Tankersley became a starter his junior year in 2015. He started all 15 games and had 60 tackles and a team-leading five interceptions. On January 9, 2017, Tankersley was part of the Clemson team that defeated top-ranked and previously undefeated Alabama in the 2017 College Football Playoff National Championship by a score of 35–31. In the game, he had five total tackles and one pass defended.

Professional career
Tankersley was one of 60 collegiate defensive backs to attend the NFL Scouting Combine in Indianapolis, Indiana. He completed all of the combine drills and finished fifth among all defensive backs in the 40-yard dash. On March 16, 2017, Tankersley attended Clemson's pro day, but opted to stand on his combine numbers and only performed the vertical jump (30½") and positional drills. Team representatives from all 32 teams attended, including head coaches Mike Tomlin (Steelers), John Fox (Bears), Mike Mularkey (Titans), and Jim Caldwell (Lions). He attended private workouts and visits with multiple teams, including the Dallas Cowboys and Miami Dolphins. At the conclusion of the pre-draft process, he was projected to be a second to fourth round draft pick by NFL draft experts and analysts. Tankersley was ranked the 11th best cornerback prospect in the draft by NFLDraftScout.com.

Miami Dolphins

2017
The Miami Dolphins selected Tankersley in the third round (97th overall) of the 2017 NFL Draft. He was the 16th cornerback selected in 2017.

On May 5, 2017, the Miami Dolphins signed him to a four-year, $3.17 million contract that includes a signing bonus of $706,288.

Tankersley competed against Alterraun Verner and Walt Aikens for the role as the third cornerback on the depth chart after Tony Lippett tore his ACL during training camp. Head coach Adam Gase named Tankersley the fifth cornerback on the Dolphins' depth chart, behind Xavien Howard, Byron Maxwell, Alterraun Verner, and Bobby McCain to begin the regular season.

Tankersley was inactive as a healthy scratch for the first two games (Weeks 2–3) of the regular season. On October 1, 2017, he made his professional regular season debut and first career start after he surpassed Byron Maxwell and Alterraun Verner on the depth chart due to poor play exhibited by both. He recorded a season-high five combined tackles and deflected a pass during the 20–0 loss to the New Orleans Saints. As a rookie in his debut, Saints' quarterback Drew Brees targeted Tankersley as he was matched up with Michael Thomas. He allowed just four of seven completions for 36-yards and congratulated by Drew Brees for his play. Head coach Adam Gase stated Xavien Howard and Cordrea Tankersley would remain the starting outside corners moving forward with Bobby McCain remaining as the starting nickelback. In Week 10, Tankersley recorded a season-high six combined tackles during a 45–21 loss at the Carolina Panthers. On December 3, 2017, he collected two solo tackles and sustained a shoulder injury in the first half. He left after suffering an ankle injury in the second half as the Dolphins routed the Denver Broncos 35–9. The injuries sidelined him for the next three games (Weeks 14–16). He finished his rookie season with 31 combined tackles (27 solo) and seven pass deflections in 11 games and 11 starts.

2018–2020
On November 2, 2018, Tankersley was placed on injured reserve after suffering a torn ACL in practice.

On August 31, 2019, Tankersley was placed on the reserve/PUP list to start the season while recovering from the torn ACL.

Tankersley was placed on the reserve/COVID-19 list by the Dolphins on July 27, 2020. He was activated from the list seven days later and waived from the team the same day. He was re-signed to the Dolphins practice squad on September 16, 2020. He was released on November 2.

Minnesota Vikings
On November 9, 2020, the Minnesota Vikings signed Tankersley to their practice squad. He was elevated to the active roster on December 19 and January 2, 2021, for the team's weeks 15 and 17 games against the Chicago Bears and Detroit Lions, and reverted to the practice squad after each game. He signed a reserve/future contract with the Vikings on January 4, 2021. On March 5, 2021, he was released by the Vikings.

References

External links

Clemson Tigers bio

1993 births
Living people
Players of American football from South Carolina
American football cornerbacks
Clemson Tigers football players
Miami Dolphins players
Minnesota Vikings players
People from Beech Island, South Carolina
Hargrave Military Academy alumni